Zemmoa is the stage name, a Mexican singer-songwriter and musical artist. She is known for her song Mi Amor Soy Yo featuring Tessa Ía and Trans-X that went viral on Spotify in 2021.

Life and career

1986-2005: Early life
She is the daughter of Rodolfo Becerril Straffon. Her father was a Mexican politician and professor at the Polytechnic University of the State of Morelos. Zemmoa's stage name derives from the French "C'est moi" which means "it's me". She had her musical debut during Paris Hilton's first visit to Mexico City in 2005.

She grew up surrounded by classical music. Her grandmother was a piano teacher at the Conservatorio Nacional de Música (Mexico); her grandfather, Jesús Silva, was a guitarist, a colleague of maestro Andrés Segovia and with a scholarship named in her honor at Virginia Commonwealth University in the United States. Zemmoa mentioned other transgender artists such as Honey Dijon and Wendy Carlos as her influences when she started in music as a self-taught person.

2006-2012: Career beginnings
In 2006 her song "Fashion Victims", which samples Shake Your Groove Thing, was  part of the soundtrack of Así del precipicio directed by Teresa Suárez. In that year she was the opening act for Peaches (musician), Technotronic, and Erasure.

In 2008, Zemmoa hosted the Latin Grammy Awards party in New York. In 2009, she made the "Born To Tour" tour of Mexico as well as in Paris, Berlin, Barcelona, Madrid, Brussels, Vienna, New York, Chicago, Los Angeles, and Bogotá. In 2010, she released her first video with Zemmporio Records titled "Zeuz". In 2012, she made a cameo appearance in Julieta Venegas' music video "Tuve Para Dar".

She has been a model for fashion designers such as for Calvin Klein Mexico, Marvin Durán, Quetzalcóatl Rangel, ManCandy, Carlos Temores, Denis Marcheboud, and the Peruvian photographer Mario Testino.

She was also the Bouncer (doorman) of the MN Roy club, which was the home of Manabendra Nath Roy, one of the founders of the Mexican Communist Party.

In 2012, she launched the calendar Z01Z, a limited edition calendar (1,000 copies) whose photographs were taken by 15 renowned international artists of contemporary Mexican art, such as Gregory Allen, Yvonne Venegas, Napoleón Habéica, Emilio Valdés, Miguel Calderón, Mauricio Limón, among others, sponsored by Vice México and Cine Tonalá.

2023: Universal Music 
Zemmoa leaves her stage as an independent artist behind and signs a contract with Universal Music México.

Activism 
She participated in conferences for the Women's Weekend forum at the Mercedes-Benz Fashion Week Mexico at the St. Regis Hotels & Resorts, Mexico City.

In 2019, she was the first 100 percent Mexican advertising campaign that P&G presented at the Global Citizen Forum at the 73 General Assembly of the United Nations (UN) as an official spokesperson for the rights of the population LGBT.

In 2022, Zemmoa was interviewed by "El Once", "Sistema Público de Radiodifusión del Estado Mexicano (SPR)" and the "Instituto Nacional de las Mujeres (INMUJERES)", for their project “Yo, ellas, nosotras”, a digital production in the format of Draw My Life among other transgender women: Láurel Miranda (journalist), Amelia Waldorf (drag queen), Natalia Lane (sex worker), Mickey Cundapí (content creator), Eliza Sonrisas (comedian), Samantha Flores (activist), Alejandra Bogue y Salma Luévano . During the 20-meter flag signing, at the International Transgender Day of Visibility held at the foot of the Monumento a la Revolución, Zemmoa with Kenya Cuevas and Lepaline, gathered over 20 thousand signatures from people around the world showing their solidarity with the transgender community in Mexico City.

Zemmoa participated on the music video "Mujeres Ya!" for International Women's Day along with Alba Messa, Ainoa Buitrago, Mery Granados, Angy, Ania, Lolita De Sola, Natasha Dupeyron, Soy Emilia, Violetta Arriaza and Volver.

Awards
In 2021 Zemmoa was awarded with the Premio Maguey Queer icon Award in honor of her work as a Mexican singer.

TV

Twourist
Zemmoa appeared on Twourist, a new show from TNT (American TV network), with the presenter Victoria Volkova.

Film

BDAY
Was an actress in the movie BDAY directed by Andrew Lush in Los Angeles (2016).

Deep Gold
Was an actress in the movie Deep Gold from Julian Rosefeldt in Berlin in 2013.

Discography

Albums
2013: Puro Desamor Volumen 1
2015: NNVAV
2018: Zemmoa Covers
2021: Lo Que Me Haces Sentir
2022: LQMHS Remixes

Songs
2021: "Mi Amor Soy Yo"
2022: "Querido Corazón"

References

External links

1986 births
Mexican LGBT singers
Living people
People from Cuernavaca
Transgender women musicians
Transgender actresses
Transgender female models
Mexican LGBT songwriters
Transgender singers
Transgender songwriters